Simone Weiler (née Karn, 16 December 1978) is a German swimmer who won a gold medal in the 4×100 m medley relay at the 2002 European Aquatics Championships (50 m pool). She also won three bronze medals in breaststroke in 2003–2005 at short-course (25 m pool) European championships. She competed at the 2000 Summer Olympics in the 100 m breaststroke but failed to reach the final. Between 2001 and 2002 she won four national titles in breaststroke events. Around 2000–2001 she married and changed her last name from Karn to Weiler.

After retirement from senior swimming she competed in the masters category.

References

1978 births
Living people
German female swimmers
Female breaststroke swimmers
Olympic swimmers of Germany
Swimmers at the 2000 Summer Olympics
European Aquatics Championships medalists in swimming
People from Speyer
Sportspeople from Rhineland-Palatinate